The University of Chakwal (UOC) is a public university located in Chakwal, Punjab Pakistan. It was established in January, 2020 through the University of Chakwal ACT 2019 (Punjab Act No. I of 2020). An exalted chapter was added in the history of Pakistan as well as the Chakwal district, when the incumbent Minister for Higher Education Department, Govt. of the Punjab, Raja Yassir Humayun, presented the bill of establishment of "University of Chakwal" in the Punjab Assembly which was approved unanimously by combining Government Post Graduate College (Chakwal) and Old Kachehri Balkasar Sub-campuses of University of Engineering and Technology, Taxila.
 
The University of Chakwal has four faculties; Faculty of Engineering, Faculty of Basic Sciences, Faculty of Arts and Faculty of Computer Sciences & IT consisting of 21 departments. The existing batch 2015 of Electronics and Mechatronics Engineering studying under the University of Chakwal have been accredited by Pakistan Engineering Council under level II (Washington Accord).
[Item #19].

The Faculty of Engineering of the University of Chakwal will offer Bachelor's of Engineering in Electronics, Mechatronics and Petroleum & Gas, while Faculties of Arts, Basic Sciences and Computer Sciences and Information Technology offer degree programs in various disciplines.

The university was originally planned to be called North Punjab University with an estimated budget of Rs. 1000 Million.

The name of University of Chakwal was previously allocated to a private institute that was established in 2015. The university was planned to offered 4-years Bachelor's degree in basic sciences, social sciences, management sciences and computer sciences. It was a project by the Horizon College Chakwal. It was the Chakwal's first private university located at the main Bhaun Road in Chakwal having four faculties; Faculty of Natural Sciences, Faculty of Arts and Social Sciences, Faculty of Management Sciences and Faculty of Computer Sciences which consisted of 18 departments.

In May 2017, Higher Education Commission cancelled the No Objective Certificate (NOC) granted to Private University of Chakwal.[1] [2]

In May 2017, Higher Education Commission cancelled the No Objective Certificate (NOC) granted to Private University of Chakwal.

On 17 January 2020, University of Chakwal Act 2019 came into force establishing Public sector University of Chakwal.

Faculties

References

External links
UOC official website

Public universities in Punjab, Pakistan
Public universities and colleges in Punjab, Pakistan
2020 establishments in Pakistan
Educational institutions established in 2020
Chakwal District